The Women's Individual normal hill ski jumping event at the FIS Nordic World Ski Championships 2009 was held on 20 February 2009. This was the first time the event was held at a World Championship.

Results

References

FIS Nordic World Ski Championships 2009